Ford has used the 500 name on a number of cars, beginning with the 1957 Ford and continuing to the 2007 Ford Five Hundred:

 1957–1959 Ford Fairlane 500 — upscale full-size car
 1961 Ford Fairlane 500 — nicer base-model full-size car
 1962–1964 Ford Galaxie 500 — upscale full-size car
 1962–1971 Ford Fairlane 500 — upscale mid-size car
 1964–1978 Ford Custom 500 — nicer base-model full-size car
 1965–1974 Ford Galaxie 500 — upscale full-size car
 1971–1971 Ford Torino 500 — intermediate-size car
 2005–2007 Ford Five Hundred— full-size family sedan

500